A German Robinson Crusoe is a 1940 German drama film directed by Arnold Fanck and starring Herbert A.E. Böhme, Marieluise Claudius, and Claus Clausen. Written by Arnold Fanck and Rolf Meyer, the film is a modern-day Robinson Crusoe story about a man so angry about the post-World War I conditions in Weimar Germany that he voluntarily goes to live on a desert island. The film was shot partly on location in South America.

Plot
During World War I, the German cruiser SMS Dresden is attacked by British ships off the coast of Chile. The crew manages to abandon ship before it sinks. They make their way to an isolated island where they are taken prisoner. After spending three years in custody, the sailors manage to escape and make their way back to Germany, intending to continue fighting for their Fatherland. When they arrive, however, they encounter a different Germany from the one they left behind—one where they are ridiculed and attacked by mutineers.

One of the returning crew, Carl Ohlse, leaves Weimar Germany and returns to the island where he had been held prisoner for three years, determined to live out the rest of his life as a Robinson Crusoe. Some time later, he hears a radio report that describes how things have improved in Germany during the 1930s. Later, when the new SMS Dresden passes the island, he makes his way to the ship and is taken aboard by his new respectful comrades.

Cast
Herbert A.E. Böhme as Carl Ohlsen
Marieluise Claudius as Antje
Claus Clausen as Fritz Grothe
Oskar Marion as captain
Malte Jäger as officer
Wilhelm P. Krüger as Pagels
Otto Kronburger as commander
Wolf Dietrich as officer
Ludwig Schmid-Wildy as sailor
Leopold Kerscher as sailor
Martin Rickelt as sailor Peter
Georg Völkel as 1. officer
Hans Kühlewein as Obermaat
Charly Berger as staff surgeon
Günther Polensen as sailor
Hans-Joachim Fanck as little Peter

References
Notes

Bibliography

External links

Films directed by Arnold Fanck
Films of Nazi Germany
1940s adventure drama films
Seafaring films
Films set in Germany
Films set in the 1910s
Films set in the 1920s
Films set in the 1930s
German World War I films
Films set on uninhabited islands
Films about castaways
German black-and-white films
German adventure drama films
1940 drama films
1940s German films
1940s German-language films